The Forum for International Conciliation and Arbitration (FICA) is a non-governmental organisation providing arbitration, dispute-resolution and dispute-avoidance services, founded by Ben Beaumont.

The first operation was initiated by ITC which recommended FICA to work with the Law Association of Zambia to create a new Arbitration Act, enacted in 2002,  and train potential Arbitrators during 1996/1997 with funding provided by Chemonics and USAID.

Ben Beaumont was co-opted into the Expert Group of Working Group VI Secured Transactions assisting with the Draft Legislative Guide to the Model Law of Secured Transactions 2005–07.

In 2002 FICA was invited with Observer status to attend UNCITRAL and was accredited to the WTO in 1999 and International Trade Centre (ITC) in 1998.

The Honorary Presidents are: Sir Michael Burton and Professor Anthony Finkelstein.

The Board of Directors as at 2021 is: The Directors are: Ben Beaumont, Tim Lemay, Alan Anderson, Jeffrey Chan, Herman Verbist, Matthew Finn, Robert Ashdown and Petra Butler.

External links
Forum for International Conciliation and Arbitration

Arbitration organizations
International trade organizations